Francis Charles Nagot (1734–1816) was a French Roman Catholic priest, who worked for the Society of Saint-Sulpice. He is perhaps most famous for founding two Catholic teaching establishments in Baltimore, USA.

References

18th-century French Roman Catholic priests
19th-century French Roman Catholic priests
1734 births
1816 deaths